Michael Fox may refer to:

Entertainment
 Michael Fox (American actor) (1921–1996), American character actor
 Michael Fox (British actor) (born 1989), British actor
 Michael J. Fox (born 1961), Canadian-American actor

Law and politics
 Michael Fox (judge) (1921–2007), English barrister and Court of Appeal judge
 Michael Fox (lawyer) (1934–2009), British-born Israeli lawyer
 Michael A. Fox, member of the Ohio House of Representatives
 Mike Fox (politician), member of the Montana Senate

Religion and philosophy
 Michael Allen Fox (born 1940), American/Canadian/Australian philosopher
 Michael Fox (priest) (born 1942), British priest
 Michael V. Fox, American Bible scholar

Science 

 Michael D. Fox, American neurologist

Sports
 Mike Fox (American football) (born 1967), American football player formerly with the New York Giants
 Mike Fox (baseball), retired baseball coach of the North Carolina Tar Heels
 Mike Fox (soccer) (born 1961), American soccer player
 Mike Fox (horse), Canadian racehorse
 Michael Fox (Ice hockey) (born 1989), English professional ice hockey player